A special election was held in  on October 11, 1808 to fill a vacancy left by the resignation of Joseph Clay (DR) on March 28, 1808.

Election results

Say took his seat on November 16, 1808.

See also
 List of special elections to the United States House of Representatives

References

Pennsylvania 1808 01
Pennsylvania 1808 01
1808 01
Pennsylvania 01
United States House of Representatives 01
United States House of Representatives 1808 01